Rock Paper Shotgun (also rendered Rock, Paper, Shotgun; short RPS) is a UK-based website for reporting on video games, primarily for PC. Originally launched on 13 July 2007 as an independent site, Rock Paper Shotgun was acquired and brought into the Gamer Network, a network of sites led by Eurogamer in May 2017. Its editor-in-chief is Katharine Castle, and its deputy editor is Alice Bell.

Contributors 
Rock Paper Shotgun was founded by Kieron Gillen, Jim Rossignol, Alec Meer and John Walker in 2007. All four were freelancing for Future Publishing, and decided they wanted to create a website focused entirely on games for PC.

Gillen announced that he would no longer be involved in posting the day-to-day content of Rock Paper Shotgun in 2010, focusing more on his work with Marvel Comics, but would continue to act as a director and occasionally write essay pieces for the site. Rossignol founded his own game studio Big Robot in 2010, but also continued to contribute to the site for six more years. Meer and Walker left in 2019.

Rock Paper Shotgun also has seen contributions from several other writers, including:

 Leigh Alexander
 Cara Ellison
 Cassandra Khaw
 Porpentine
 Emily Short
 Robert Yang

Content 

Rock Paper Shotgun reports on upcoming major releases and independent esoterica, and includes reviews, previews, features and interviews related to PC gaming and the PC gaming industry.

Some of the frequent categories of stories posted on Rock Paper Shotgun include:
 Diary: Impressions of a game presented in 'diary' form, often from the perspectives of many writers, and over the course of many parts or updates, such as Solium Infernum: The Complete Battle for Hell or Diary of a Nobutoki: Sengoku. These articles are differentiated from reviews as they do not seek to objectively evaluate a game, only to present the experiences of the writers playing.
 The Fixer: A column featuring guides on tinkering and fixing games.
 The Flare Path: Weekly news and impressions of simulation and war games, written by Tim Stone.
 Kickstarter Katchup: A weekly round up of PC game Kickstarter projects.
 RPS Bargain Bucket: A weekly round up of discounted gaming downloads available from third party gaming websites.
 The Sunday Papers: A weekly round up of gaming related news.
 Wot I Think: Review of a particular game, including what the reviewer thought of the game based on their first hand experience.
 Live Free, Play Hard: A weekly round up of free indie games, written by Porpentine.
 Hard Choices: A column on PC hardware releases and purchasing recommendations, written by Jeremy Laird.
 Cardboard Children: News and reviews of tabletop board games, written by Robert Florence.
 Have You Played: A weekday series of gaming retrospectives.

Controversies

Fox News and Bulletstorm
On 8 February 2011, the game Bulletstorm came under scrutiny by Fox News through two articles by journalist John Brandon, describing the game as the worst game in the world. The game was targeted because of its profanity, crude behaviour (examples of which including the game's skill-shot system, which has a move that rewards players for shooting at an enemy's genitals), and sexual innuendo. Alongside the panel of Fox News anchors was the psychiatrist Carole Lieberman, who remarked: "Video games have increasingly, and more brazenly, connected sex and violence in images, actions and words. This has the psychological impact of doubling the excitement, stimulation, and incitement to copycat acts. The increase in rapes can be attributed, in large part, to the playing out of such scenes in video games." Other claims included that the game could reach audiences as young as nine years old, and that the gore and profanity could seriously traumatise a child of that age group.

These claims were largely ridiculed among gaming websites, including Rock Paper Shotgun, who ran a series of articles discrediting the reports by Fox News. The articles analysed Lieberman's claims and found only one of eight sources she provided had anything to do with the subject at hand. Fox News acknowledged that they had been contacted by Rock Paper Shotgun and responded to their claims on 20 February 2011 through another article, stating that the game still remained a threat to children.

Public domain article
In 2014 a Rock Paper Shotgun article by John Walker about the existence of orphaned classic video games, and the suggestion to let them enter the public domain after 20 years, raised a controversial public debate about copyright terms and public domain between game industry veterans John Walker, George Broussard and Steve Gaynor.

References

External links 
 

2007 establishments in the United Kingdom
British entertainment websites
Internet properties established in 2007
Video game blogs